Haukvik is a Norwegian surname. Notable people with the surname include:

Arne Haukvik (1926–2002), Norwegian sports official and politician
Olav Haukvik (1928–1992), Norwegian politician

Norwegian-language surnames